"Dimelo" is a song by British group Rak-Su, released after their victory on the fourteenth series of The X Factor as the winner's single. The group first performed the song on week two of the live shows as part of Latino Week. They performed it again in the final, this time with featured vocals from Wyclef Jean and production from Naughty Boy, with this version released as their first official single. The original solo version of the track was recorded in the studio before its first performance on The X Factor. Within 24 hours of winning the show, "Dimelo" placed at number 46 on the Official UK Singles Chart, and has since peaked at number 2, held back from the top spot by Ed Sheeran's "Perfect". The song has also been successful on streaming sites, entering the UK top 50 daily chart on Spotify.

The song assimilates to a genre common among Spanish speakers, reggaeton. It pays tribute to four stars: Jennifer Lopez, Camila Cabello, Shakira and Rihanna. A solo version of the song was featured on the group's self-titled debut extended play, Rak-Su.

Track listing

Charts

Certifications

Release history

References

2017 songs
2017 singles
Rak-Su songs
Wyclef Jean songs
Naughty Boy songs
Songs written by Wyclef Jean
Songs written by Lil' Eddie
Songs written by Andrew Haas
Songs written by Ian Franzino
The X Factor (British TV series)